The 2023 Turkish Basketball Cup, also known as Bitci Erkekler Türkiye Kupası for sponsorship reasons, is the 37th edition of Turkey's top-tier level professional national domestic basketball cup competition. The quarterfinals of the tournament were originally scheduled to be held on February 14–15, 2023 in 4 different locations and then the semi-finals and the final on February 17–19, 2023, respectively, in the Selçuklu Belediyesi Spor Salonu in Konya, Turkey. However, on 7 February 2023, the Turkish Basketball Federation announced that the competition was postponed indefinitely, after the 2023 Turkey–Syria earthquake.

Qualified teams 
The top eight placed teams after the first half of the top-tier level Basketball Super League 2022–23 season qualified for the tournament. The four highest-placed teams are going to play against the lowest-seeded teams in the quarter-finals. The competition will be played under a single elimination format.

Draw
The 2023 Turkish Basketball Cup was drawn on January 23, 2023. The seeded teams were paired in the quarterfinals with the non-seeded teams.

Bracket

Quarterfinals

See also
2022–23 Basketbol Süper Ligi

References

External links
Official Site

Turkish Cup Basketball seasons
Cup